José Agustín Morales Mota (born 13 January 1971) is a Mexican former footballer who played as a midfielder. He competed in the men's tournament at the 1992 Summer Olympics.

References

External links
 
 

Living people
1971 births
Sportspeople from Querétaro City
Footballers from Querétaro
Association football midfielders
Mexican footballers
Liga MX players
Cruz Azul footballers
Santos Laguna footballers
Atlético Celaya footballers
Chiapas F.C. footballers
Mexico international footballers
Olympic footballers of Mexico
Footballers at the 1992 Summer Olympics